{{DISPLAYTITLE:Tau1 Capricorni}}

Tau1 Capricorni (τ1 Cap, τ1 Capricorni) is a star in the constellation Capricornus. It has an apparent magnitude of 6.76, making it readily visible in binoculars, but not to the naked eye. Due to its location near the ecliptic, τ1 Cap can be occulted by the Moon and rarely planets.

τ1 Capricorni has a stellar classification of K1 III, indicating that it is an ageing K-type giant.

References

Capricorni, Tau1
Capricornus (constellation)
K-type giants
Capricorni, 13
101751
196348
Durchmusterung objects